Greece competed at the 2022 Winter Olympics in Beijing, China, from 4 to 20 February 2022. As the founding nation of the Olympic games and in keeping with tradition, Greece entered first during the opening ceremony. Greece has yet to win a medal in the Winter Olympics. 

Apostolos Angelis and Maria Ntanou were the country's flagbearer during the opening ceremony. Meanwhile alpine skier Ioannis Antoniou was the flagbearer during the closing ceremony.

Competitors
The following is the list of number of competitors participating at the Games per sport/discipline.

Alpine skiing

By meeting the basic qualification standards Greece qualified one male and one female alpine skier.

Cross-country skiing

Greece qualified one male and two female cross-country skiers.

Due to high winds and adverse weather conditions, the men's 50 km freestyle competition on 19 February was shortened to 28.4 km. 

Distance

Sprint

References

Nations at the 2022 Winter Olympics
2022
Winter Olympics